Namkoong Won (born August 1, 1934) is a South Korean actor. Namkoong was born Hong Gyeong-il in 1934. He was a popular actor of the 1960s along with Shin Seong-il, Shin Young-kyun and Choi Moo-ryong.

Filmography 
* Note; the whole list is referenced.

Awards 
 1970, the 6th Baeksang Arts Awards : Favorite Film Actor selected by readers
 1970, the 7th Blue Dragon Film Awards : Favorite Actor
 1971, the 7th Baeksang Arts Awards : Favorite Film Actor selected by readers
 1971, the 8th Blue Dragon Film Awards : Favorite Actor
 1972, the 8th Baeksang Arts Awards : Favorite Film Actor selected by readers
 1973, the 12th Grand Bell Awards : Best Actor (다정다한)
 1973, the 9th Baeksang Arts Awards : Best Film Actor (충녀)
 1973, the 9th Baeksang Arts Awards : Favorite Film Actor selected by readers
 1974, the 10th Baeksang Arts Awards : Favorite Film Actor selected by readers
 1975, the 11th Baeksang Arts Awards : Favorite Film Actor selected by readers
 1981, the 20th Grand Bell Awards : Best Actor (피막)

References

External links 

1934 births
Male actors from Seoul
Living people
South Korean male film actors
South Korean male television actors
Namyang Hong clan